Katharine Eustace (born 16 April 1975) is a New Zealand skeleton racer. She is a participant at the 2014 Winter Olympics in Sochi.

Eustace took up skeleton in 2007.  She was born and raised in Great Britain. She has competed in international events in Canada, the United States and Europe.  She placed fifth at the Intercontinental Cup in Cesana, Italy in 2009 and seventh in the America's Cup in Calgary .

Ms. Eustace was born in Bristol, and went to university in Birmingham. She works as a physiotherapist in Wanaka.

References

External links
 

1975 births
Skeleton racers at the 2014 Winter Olympics
Living people
Olympic skeleton racers of New Zealand
New Zealand female skeleton racers
University of Otago alumni
20th-century New Zealand women
21st-century New Zealand women